The 2016–17 Old Dominion Monarchs men’s basketball team represented Old Dominion University during the 2016–17 NCAA Division I men's basketball season. The Monarchs, led by fourth-year head coach Jeff Jones, played their home games at the Ted Constant Convocation Center in Norfolk, Virginia as members of Conference USA. They finished the season 19–12, 12–6 in C-USA play to finish in a tie for third place. They lost in the quarterfinals of the C-USA tournament to Marshall. Despite finishing with 19 wins, they did not participate in a postseason tournament.

Previous season
The Monarchs finished the 2015–16 season 25–13, 12–6 in C-USA play to finish in a three-way tie for third place. They defeated Florida Atlantic, Louisiana Tech, and WKU to advance to the championship game of the C-USA tournament where they lost to Middle Tennessee. They received an invitation to the inaugural Vegas 16, where they defeated Tennessee Tech, UC Santa Barbara, and Oakland to become the Vegas 16 champions.

Preseason
The Monarchs were picked to finish in fifth place in the preseason Conference USA poll.

Departures

Incoming transfers

2016 recruiting class

Roster

Schedule and results

|-
!colspan=12 style=| Spain Trip

|-
!colspan=12 style=| Exhibition

|-
!colspan=12 style=|Non-conference regular season

|-
!colspan=12 style=| Conference USA regular season

|-
!colspan=12 style=| Conference USA tournament

Source

References

Old Dominion Monarchs men's basketball seasons
Old Dominion
Old Dominion
Old Dominion